Phyllanthus nadeaudii is a species of tree in the family Phyllanthaceae. It is endemic to the island of Moorea in French Polynesia, where it is found on several mountains above 420 meters elevation. P. nadeaudii the species may be the only species of tree endemic to this island.

References

Endemic flora of French Polynesia
Vulnerable plants
nadeaudii
Flora of the Society Islands
Taxonomy articles created by Polbot
Mo'orea
Taxobox binomials not recognized by IUCN